Kalyan East Assembly constituency is one of the 288 Vidhan Sabha (legislative assembly) constituencies of Maharashtra state, western India. This constituency is located in Thane district.

Geographical scope
The constituency comprises parts of Kalyan taluka that is ward
No. 13 to 30 of Kalyan Dombivali Municipal Corporation, parts of Ambernath taluka viz. revenue circle
Kumbharli, parts of Ulhasnagar taluka viz. Ward No. 23 to 26, 43, and 52 to 55 of Ulhasnagar Municipal Corporation.

List of Members of Legislative Assembly

Election results

Assembly Elections 2019

Assembly Elections 2014

Assembly Elections 2009

References

Assembly constituencies of Thane district
Assembly constituencies of Maharashtra
Kalyan-Dombivli